Sevoor S. Ramachandran is an Indian politician and a member of the 15th Tamil Nadu Legislative Assembly. He was elected from Arni constituency, Thiruvannamalai as a candidate of the AIADMK. He became the Minister for Hindu Religious and Charitable Endowments in 2016.

He belongs to Sengunthar Kaikola Mudaliar (Kadambarayan Gothram) community.

References

Tamil Nadu MLAs 2016–2021
State cabinet ministers of Tamil Nadu
All India Anna Dravida Munnetra Kazhagam politicians
Living people
Year of birth missing (living people)
Tamil Nadu MLAs 2021–2026